Machala is a city in south-west Ecuador. It is the capital of the El Oro Province, and is located near the Gulf of Guayaquil on fertile lowlands. Machala has a population of 241,606 (2010 census); it is the eighth-biggest city in the country, and the second-most important port. It has been referred to as the Banana Capital of the World.

Economy

Machala is a commercial center for the surrounding agriculture industries. There is a large trade in bananas, coffee and cocoa. The banana industry is especially oriented for exportation, and plays a huge role in the city's economy. Bananas are shipped out from nearby Puerto Bolívar mainly to North America. Machala's geographical position near Guayaquil also makes it an important transportation center. Many travelers heading south to Peru or north to Guayaquil funnel through the city. It is not known as a tourist destination among Ecuadorians or international tourists, though its proximity to the Pacific Ocean positions it close to beaches. Machala has a growing economy that was marked in 2007 by the inauguration of its first mall, with a movie theater, on the outskirts of the city.

Orientation

The center of Machala is dominated by a large Catholic church and a central plaza. The plaza was built in the early 2000s to include a large fountain. There are many hotels situated in the center of the city. Las Brisas, located nearly a mile from the central plaza, is another popular place in Machala; it is a wealthier neighborhood which used to serve as a popular hangout for local teenagers. But the remodeling of La Zona Rosa, as well as the decreased safety of the area, have led to its becoming less popular.

Education

Machala has one university, the Universidad Técnica de Machala. There are many private schools in Machala and one public high school – Colegio 9 de Octubre. The city serves as a stopping-off point on the way to nearby Puerto Bolívar and the Jambelí Islands, which can only be reached by ferry.

Climate
Machala features a hot semi-arid climate (Köppen BSh). Like most of the coastal region of Ecuador, there is a short wet season from January to April due to the retreat of the Humboldt Current. The weather in both wet and dry seasons is very warm to hot and cloudy due to persistent fog from the cold current.

Transportation

Air

Santa Rosa International Airport  serves as the city's principal airport. It hosts commercial flights to Quito with the Ecuadorian airline TAME.

Notable residents

 Gabriel Achilier (born 1985), footballer
 Jordy Caicedo (born 1997), footballer
 Gilberto Chamba, serial killer
 Fausto Tutu Guzman (born 1944), great Basketball player and Pajero Professional 
 Nicolás Asencio (born 1975), footballer
 Juan Carlos Espinoza Mercado (born 1987), footballer
 Ángel Fernández (born 1971), footballer
 Luis Miguel Garcés (born 1982), footballer
 Hólger Matamoros (born 1985), footballer
 Carlos Muñoz (1964–1993), footballer
 Ismael Pérez Pazmiño (1876–1944), journalist and politician
 Ángel Pután (born 1986), footballer
 Tania Tinoco (born 1963), journalist and television producer

References

External links

  
 Orenses - El Oro - Machala - Ecuador / Comunidad Virtual de la Provincia de El Oro News about Machala in Spanish
 Chat Orenses - El Oro - Machala - Ecuador Chat Orenses - El Oro - Machala - Ecuador
Investor info for Ecuador and Machala
Universidad Technica de Machala
Sitio informativo de la Capital Bananera del Mundo
 Ecuador, Travel in Machala

 
Populated places in El Oro Province
Populated coastal places in Ecuador
Port cities in Ecuador
Provincial capitals in Ecuador
1573 establishments in the Spanish Empire